Wamanripayuq (Quechua wamanripa Senecio, -yuq a suffix, "the one with the wamanripa plant", also spelled Huamalipayoc, Huamanripayco, Huamanripayoc, Huamanripayoj, Huarmaripayoc) may refer to:

 Wamanripayuq, a mountain in the Quispicanchi Province, Cusco Region, Peru
 Wamanripayuq (Arequipa), a mountain in the Arequipa Region, Peru
 Wamanripayuq (Canchis), a mountain in the Canchis Province, Cusco Region, Peru
 Wamanripayuq (Huancavelica), a mountain in the Huancavelica Region, Peru
 Wamanripayuq (Huánuco), a mountain in the Huánuco Region, Peru
 Wamanripayuq (Lima), a mountain in the Lima Region, Peru
 Wamanripayuq (Urubamba), a mountain in the Urubamba Province, Cusco Region, Peru

See also 
 Wamanripa (disambiguation)